John Ellis Stuttard (24 April 1920 – 1983) was an English professional association footballer who played as a full back. After retiring, he had spells as manager of Plymouth Argyle and Exeter City.

External links
 
 

1920 births
1983 deaths
People from Padiham
English footballers
English football managers
Association football defenders
Burnley F.C. players
Plymouth Argyle F.C. players
Torquay United F.C. players
Plymouth Argyle F.C. managers
Exeter City F.C. managers
English Football League players
English Football League managers